= Philip A. Haile =

American economist and professor of economics at Yale University

- Known for: Research on auctions, demand estimation, differentiated products

Academic background
- Education: Duke University (A.B.), Northwestern University (Ph.D.)

Academic work
- Institutions: Yale University

Philip A. Haile is an economist and the Ford Foundation Professor of Economics at Yale University.

== Education ==
Haile received his undergraduate degree in economics from Duke University in 1988 and Ph.D. in economics from Northwestern University in 1996.

== Career ==
Haile began his academic career with a faculty position at the University of Wisconsin-Madison before taking up a faculty position at Yale University in 2003. He has also been visiting faculty member in the economics departments of University of Chicago and Stanford University. He is now the Ford Foundation Professor of Economics at Yale. He is best known for his work on auction markets and differentiated products markets, often focusing on questions of "identification", i.e., conditions under which model primitives can be uniquely determined from market observables.

In 2002, Haile and fellow economist Susan Athey developed approaches for identification of auction models when only the transaction price and number of bidders are observed. His research has been supported by grants from the National Science Foundation and the Alfred P. Sloan Foundation.

From 2004 to 2010 he was the editor of the RAND Journal of Economics, and between 2005 and 2011 he was the Director of the Cowles Foundation for Research in Economics at Yale. As an associate editor he has also held positions at the Econometrica, the American Economic Journal of Microeconomics, and the Econometrics Journal. He is a Research Associate of the National Bureau of Economic Research, a Fellow of the Econometric Society, an International Fellow with the Centre for Microdata Methods and Practice at University College-London, and a Senior Consultant at Compass Lexecon. In 2019 he became an elected Fellow of the International Association for Applied Econometrics.
